The Challenger Coquimbo is a professional tennis tournament played on clay courts. It is currently part of the Association of Tennis Professionals (ATP) Challenger Tour. It has been held in Coquimbo, Chile since 2022 as part of the Legión Sudamericana.

Past finals

Singles

Doubles

References

ATP Challenger Tour
Clay court tennis tournaments
Tennis tournaments in Chile